Bracha Qafih (1922 – 26 November 2013) was an Israeli rabbanit, wife of Rabbi Yosef Qafih, who was awarded the Israel Prize for her charitable work.

Bracha Qafih was born in Yemen. She was married to her first cousin, Yosef Kapach, at the age of eleven. Seven years later, they immigrated to Israel with their three children, one of whom died on the way. Another son, Arieh, was born in Palestine.

Rabbanit Qafih’s first enterprise in the country was running an embroidery workshop employing 50 Yemenite women. For over half a century, she organized holiday food packages for the needy of Jerusalem. The food was packaged by student volunteers and distributed from her home in Nahlaot. Qafih also collected old wedding gowns to loan to  brides from poor families.

Awards and recognition
In 1999, Kapach was awarded the Israel Prize for her special contributions to society and the State of Israel. Kapach and her husband are the only married couple to have both won the Israel Prize.

References

1922 births
2013 deaths
Israeli Jews
Israel Prize for special contribution to society and the State recipients
Israel Prize women recipients
Yemenite Jews
Yemeni emigrants to Mandatory Palestine